Crock of Gold may refer to:

The Crock of Gold (novel), a 1912 philosophical novel by James Stephens
The Crock of Gold (album), a 1997 album by Shane MacGowan and the Popes
"Crock of Gold: A Few Rounds with Shane MacGowan", a 2020 documentary about Shane MacGowan
"The Crock of Gold," a track from the 2005 album The Valley of the Shadow of Death, by The Tossers

See also
Pot of Gold (disambiguation)